Sayyed Hasan Taqizādeh (September 27, 1878 in Tabriz, Iran – January 28, 1970 in Tehran, Iran) was an influential Iranian politician and diplomat, of Azeri origin, during the Qajar dynasty under the reign of Mohammad Ali Shah, as well as the Pahlavi dynasty under the reign of Reza Shah and Mohammad Reza Shah. Taqizadeh was also a prominent scholar; his studies on Iranian calendars remain reference work up until now.

Although in the modern political history Taqizadeh is known as a secular politician, who believed that "outwardly and inwardly, in body and in spirit, Iran must become Europeanized", he came from a traditional Islamic Sayyed-family (descendant of Muhammad). His father, Sayyed Taqi, was a clergyman and when Sayyed Hasan became a mullah, it seemed likely that he would follow in his father's footsteps. From an early age Taqizadeh showed interest in enlightened ideas and the Western concept of constitutionalism. This interest can be traced back to the socio-political sphere in which Taqizadeh became an adult. He grew up in Tabriz, the capital city of East Azerbaijan province, which was the gateway to the modern and progressive ideas coming from Russia and especially Western Europe. In the time of World War I, World War II and after, Taqizadeh was the most influential person in Iran who supported the interests of Germany against Russia and Britain.

Biography

Secretly Taqizadeh studied French and English for the purpose of becoming acquainted with the Western enlightenment and modern political thoughts. Nevertheless, he became mullah and remained one until the period in which the traditional Iranian political and socio-economic system disintegrated and the modern Iranian nation-state was formed. As early as the beginning of his political career he confronted the corrupt and despotic régime of the Qajar princes, who seemed unable to prevent the decay of their dynasty. Convinced of the destructive consequences of the despotism and corruption for the political and socio-economic development of Iran, Taqizadeh actively participated in the Constitutional Revolution (Mashruteh Revolution), which resulted in the foundation of the Majles (Parliament - مجلس شورای ملی). From this period onwards he developed into a secular enlightened politician. In 1908 his life was saved by Claude Stokes a British military attaché who allowed him to take refuge in the legation compound. He was then secured safe passage to England where he worked with Edward Granville Browne to lobby parliament for support of the constitutionalist movement.

In 1909, under the guidance of Taqizadeh the first modern pro German political party, the Ferqeh-ye Demokrat-e Iran (Democratic Party of Iran), was founded in Iran. Shortly after the outbreak of World War I, Taqizadeh allied with Germany against Russia and Britain. In Berlin he established the Komiteh-ye Iran (Committee of Iran), and together with other prominent Iranian intellectuals, he published the influential periodical Kaveh (1916–1922), which was distributed in Europe as well as in Iran. Kaveh was a political and literary journal which greatly contributed to the creation of the Iranian consciousness and national identity. This journal emphasized the need for national independence, and internal reforms, especially secular and educational ones.

Under the reign of Reza Shah Pahlavi (1925–1941), Taqizadeh contributed to the formation of the modern Iranian nation-state. During his political career of seventy years, Taqizadeh served as parliamentarian, governor-general of Khorasan province, minister of Roads and Transportation, minister of Finance, and ambassador to the United Kingdom and France. Although at the time of the Constitutional Revolution he opposed the formation of the Senate (Majles-e Sena, مجلس سنا — defunct since 1979, following adoption of a new constitution), in 1950, during the imperial government of Mohammad Reza Shah Pahlavi (1941–1978), he became its President. Taqizadeh described his life as a "tempestuous life" (Zendegi-ye Tufani), which he later used as the title of his autobiography.

Taqizadeh's views are not characterized by ideological continuity, but by many breaks in the course of his life, which have contributed to the difficulty of writing a consistent account of his life. Taqizadeh was a natural politician. If he was convinced that his alliance with a person or country would further interests of Iran, he often was ready to ally himself with them. Similarly, he would abandon his allies if he believed that his alliance would be detrimental
to his country. The following two quotations are indicative of the divergence of views that exist concerning Taqizadeh:

"He [Taqizadeh] had won deserved fame by his fearless independence and wonderful grasp of political affairs. There is something so sympathetic in his face, so attractive, with eyes sparkling with cheerful animation. (...). If I am not mistaken he is of those whose genius is capable of inspiring great enthusiasm, great sacrifices, and whose influence leaves a lasting impression of the history of nations." (Edward Granville Browne)

"In which position was Taqizadeh true and sincere? What were the motives of that contradictory behaviour? He was not adept at political truth and honour." (Fereydun Adamiyat)

Views vary as to the degree to which Taqizadeh served the interests of Iran and her people. Some experts believe that he made the Iranian interests secondary to that of the United Kingdom during the period of the Constitutional Revolution, and to that of Germany during World War I. Others suggest that he allied with the United Kingdom with the intention of protecting Iran against the Russian expansionist policies. They are of the opinion that Taqizadeh was a supporter of the Iranian constitution and that during World War I, he allied with Germany to oppose the Anglo-Russian influence which was aimed at undermining Iran's independence. In addition, they believe that in 1942 Taqizadeh attempted to bring about a close relationship between Iran and the United States of America in order to guarantee a balance of powers conducive to Iran's independence.

Chronology of Taqizadeh's life
27 September 1878: Born in Tabriz.

1896: Established the Tarbiyat (Education) school and a bookshop and set up a pharmacy in collaboration with his friends in Tabriz.

1898: Taught physics at Loqmaniya in Tabriz. Translated the book  'Ajaeb-e Asemani (Astrnomie Populaire) by Camille Flammarion.

1899/1900: Studied English at the American Memorial School in Tabriz (the Presbyterian mission school in Tabriz).

January 1903 — January 1904: Published the magazine Ganjineh-ye Fonun (Treasure of Sciences).

1904: Travelled to the Caucasus and Istanbul for six months, to Egypt for several months and to Beirut for fifty days. Published the discourse Tahqiq-e Ahval-e kononi-ye Iran ba Mohakemat-e Tarikhi (Research into the contemporary condition of Iran from historical perspective) in newspaper Hekmat (Wisdom), in Cairo.

October 1905: Returned to Tabriz.

September 1906: Arrived in Tehran. Published some articles in Neda-ye Vatan (Voice of Nation).

October 1906: Elected by merchants of Tabriz as deputy to the First Majles. Published articles in Sur-e Esrafil (whose editor, Mirza Jahangir Khan, of Bábí background, was killed following Mohammad Ali Shah's coup d'état of June 23, 1908) and Mosavat (Equality).

June 1908: Was exiled from Iran by Mohammad Ali Shah; left for Europe.

September 1908: Organised political activities against Mohammad Ali Shah in the United Kingdom.

November 1908: Returned to Tabriz.

August 1909: Arrived in Tehran after the victory of Mojaheds. Membership to the "Temporarily Board of Directors". Elected deputy to the Second Majles.

October 1909: Deputy to the Second Majles and parliamentary leader of Ferqeh-ye Demokrat-e Iran (Democratic Party of Iran).

1910: Left (forced to leave Tehran) for Tabriz after the assassination of Sayyed Abdullah Behbahani (one of two prime Mojahed leaders of the revolution, the other being Sayyed Mohammad Tabātabā'i). Stayed for some months in Tabriz. 
October 1910: Arrived in Istanbul, staying there for almost two years.

1911: Left Istanbul for Europe.

June 1913: Left for New York, staying for nineteen months in the United States of America. Published four political articles in French about the political situations of Iran, Ottoman and Arabic countries in Revue du Monde Musulman (Study of the Muslim World).

January 1915: Left the United States of America for Germany (Berlin), travelling through the Netherlands.

January 1916 — March 1922: Published the periodical Kaveh (Blacksmith) in collaboration with such important writers as Sayyed Mohammad-Ali Jamalzadeh (son of Sayyed Jamal ad-Din Esfahani) and Hossein Kazemzadeh (who later became editor of the nationalist paper Iranshahr ).

January 1922 — July 1923: Went, as deputy of the Iranian State, to Moscow for formation of a friendship agreement. Stayed for one and a half year in Moscow.

1923: Married to his German wife, whom he called by the name  'Atiyeh (Gift).

July 1924: Returned to Iran. Elected deputy to the Fifth Majles. Became member of the Ma'aref (Cultural Affairs) Commission.

June 1926: Travelled to the United States of America as official Iranian representative to the Philadelphia Sesquicentennial Exposition of 1926. Membership of the "Council of Founders" of the "Society of National Opuses".

1927: Returned to Iran. Elected deputy to the Sixth Majles.

1928: Became Governor-general of Khorasan province.

1929: Became Iranian Minister Plenipotentiary to London.

March 1930: Returned to Iran. Accepted to become Minister of Roads and Transport.

August 1930 — August 1933: Was Minister of Finance.

April 1933: Signing of the prolongation of the oil-concession.

November 1933 — July 1934: Became Iranian Minister Plenipotentiary to Paris.

1934: Travelled to the United Kingdom for his Lecture at Royal Society of Arts about the Iranian situation. End of his duties assigned to him by the Iranian embassy in Paris. Left for Berlin, staying there for fifteen months.

1935: Was Iranian Deputy at the "International Association of Orientalists" in Rome.

1936: Went to London to teach at the then School of Oriental Studies (SOAS), University of London. Taqizadeh was a temporary member of the teaching staff of Iranian and Persian Studies alongside Vladimir Minorsky, A. J. Arberry and W. B. Henning. He briefly moved with SOAS to University of Cambridge when SOAS was evacuated to there at the beginning of the World War II.

October 1941: Became Iranian ambassador to the United Kingdom. Was Chairman of the Iranian delegation to the United Nations in connection with the case of Azerbaijan.

1945: Protest to the United Nations in connection with the Russian occupation of Tabriz.

October 1947: Elected deputy from Tabriz to the Fifteenth Majles. Was Chairman of the Iranian Board at the Congress of Orientalists (Cambridge, United Kingdom), Chairman of the Iranian Board at International Congress of Avicenna (Baghdad), Chairman of International Congress of Avicenna (Tehran).

1949 — 1967: Deputy at the Senate. Chairman of Senate.

1954: Was Scientific adviser and member of the Board of Directors of the "Translation Institution and Book Publication".

1954: Participated in the International Congress of Orientalists in Cambridge (United Kingdom).

1957: Chairman of the Iranian Board at Congress of Orientalists (Munich). Went to the United States of America for teaching at Columbia University.

1958: Was Chairman of the Iranian Society of Philosophy and Humanities. Participated in the establishment of an offset printing-house.

1966: Was Chairman of the first International Congress of Iranists (Tehran).

28 January 1970: Died in Tehran.

See also
 Howard Baskerville (1885–1909), the "American Lafayette in Iran".
 Abdolhossein Teymourtash
 List of Iranian senators
 List of Iranian Ambassadors to the United Kingdom
 Revival Party

Notes

References
 Sepehr H. Joussefi, Seyyed Hasan Taqizadeh: a Political Biography in the Context of Iranian Modernization, Master Thesis (University of Utrecht, The Netherlands, 1998). 
 Nikki R. Keddie, with a section by Yann Richard, Modern Iran: Roots and results of revolution, revised and updated edition (Yale University Press, New Haven, 2003). 
 A locust's leg. Studies in honour of S. H. Taqizadeh, pp. vii and 250 (Percy Lund, Humphries & Co., Ltd., London, 1962). For a review of this work see: M. J. Dresden, Journal of the American Oriental Society, Vol. 85, No. 2, pp. 260–262 (1965).

Further reading
 Ahmad Kasravi, Tarikh-e Mashruteh-ye Iran (تاریخ مشروطهٔ ایران) (History of the Iranian Constitutional Revolution), in Persian, 951 p. (Negāh Publications, Tehran, 2003), . Note: This book is also available in two volumes, published by Amir Kabir Publications in 1984. Amir Kabir's 1961 edition is in one volume, 934 pages.
 Ahmad Kasravi, History of the Iranian Constitutional Revolution: Tarikh-e Mashrute-ye Iran, Volume I, translated into English by Evan Siegel, 347 p. (Mazda Publications, Costa Mesa, California, 2006). 
 Mehdi Malekzādeh, Tārikh-e Enqelāb-e Mashrutiyyat-e Iran (تاريخ انقلاب مشروطيت ايران) (The History of the Constitutional Revolution of Iran), in 7 volumes, published in 3 volumes, 1697 p. (Sokhan Publications, Tehran, 2004 – 1383 AH).   Note: Mehdi Malekzādeh is son of the Constitutional revolutionary Mirzā Nasr'ollah Beheshti, best known as Malek al-Motakallemin (King of Orators).(For the time being consult the biography of Mirza Jahangir Khan.)
 Mangol Bayat, Iran’s First Revolution: Shi’ism and the Constitutional Revolution of 1905–1909, Studies in Middle Eastern History, 336 p. (Oxford University Press, 1991). 
 John Foran, The Strengths and Weaknesses of Iran’s Populist Alliance: A Class Analysis of the Constitutional Revolution of 1905 - 1911, Theory and Society, Vol. 20, No. 6, pp. 795–823 (December 1991). JSTOR

Books by Taqizadeh
 S. H. Taqizadeh, Old Iranian Calendars (Royal Asiatic Society, London, 1938). , .
 Payam Nabarz, and S. H. Taqizadeh, The Persian 'Mar Nameh': The Zoroasterian 'Book of the Snake', Omens and Calendar and The Old Iranian Calendar (Twin Serpents, Oxford, 2006). , .

External links
 Sepehr H. Joussefi, Seyyed Hasan Taqizadeh: a Political Biography in the Context of Iranian Modernization, Master Thesis (University of Utrecht, The Netherlands, 1988). 
 S. H. Taqizadeh, Old Iranian Calendars (Printed and published under the patronage of the Royal Asiatic Society, 1938). 
 A short biography of S. H. Taqizadeh in Persian. 
 Images of Revolution. The Constitutionalist Revolution: 1906-1909. 

1878 births
1970 deaths
Iranian Shia clerics
Iranian secularists
Iranian diplomats
Government ministers of Iran
Presidents of the Senate of Iran
People of the Persian Constitutional Revolution
Liberalism in Iran
Politicians  from Tabriz
Ambassadors of Iran to the United Kingdom
Ambassadors of Iran to France
Democrat Party (Persia) politicians
Revival Party politicians
Deputies of Tabriz for National Consultative Assembly
Members of the 1st Iranian Majlis
Members of the 2nd Iranian Majlis
Members of the 3rd Iranian Majlis
Grand Crosses 1st class of the Order of Merit of the Federal Republic of Germany
20th-century Iranian politicians